Jonas Björkman and Todd Woodbridge were the defending champions, but lost in the third round to Leander Paes and David Rikl.

Mark Knowles and Daniel Nestor won the title, defeating Leander Paes and David Rikl in the final, 6–3, 6–3.

Seeds

  Jonas Björkman /  Todd Woodbridge (third round)
  Bob Bryan /  Mike Bryan (third round)
  Mark Knowles /  Daniel Nestor (champions)
  Mahesh Bhupathi /  Max Mirnyi (third round)
  Michaël Llodra /  Fabrice Santoro (second round)
  Wayne Black /  Kevin Ullyett (quarterfinals)
  Wayne Arthurs /  Paul Hanley (first round)
  Martin Damm /  Cyril Suk (third round)
  Julian Knowle /  Nenad Zimonjić (second round)
  Gastón Etlis /  Martín Rodríguez (first round)
  František Čermák /  Leoš Friedl (first round)
  Jared Palmer /  Pavel Vízner (third round)
  Leander Paes /  David Rikl (final)
  Jonathan Erlich /  Andy Ram (first round)
  Lucas Arnold Ker /  Mariano Hood (second round)
  Chris Haggard /  Petr Pála (first round)

Draw

Finals

Top half

Section 1

Section 2

Bottom half

Section 3

Section 4

External links
 Main draw
2004 US Open – Men's draws and results at the International Tennis Federation

Men's Doubles
US Open (tennis) by year – Men's doubles